Chahar Qashi (also Romanized as Chahār Qāshī; also known as Chahār Qāshā) is a village in Alaviyeh Rural District, Kordian District, Jahrom County, Fars Province, Iran. At the 2006 census, its population was 189, in 27 families.

References 

Populated places in Jahrom County